The China Academy of Launch Vehicle Technology (CALT) is a major state-owned civilian and military space launch vehicle manufacturer in China and one of the major launch service providers in the world. CALT is a subsidiary of the larger China Aerospace Science and Technology Corporation (CASC). It was established in 1957 by Dr. Xue-Sen Qian and is headquartered in Fengtai District, Beijing.

Its major contribution to China's civilian and military launch capability has been the manufacture of the Long March family of rockets. CALT has 31,600 employees and at least 13 research facilities. The current Chief Designer is Long Lehao.

CALT is also planning two spaceplanes. They would both be single-stage to space sub-orbital rocketplanes. One would be a 10-ton 4-passenger plane that would fly to 100 km at Mach 6. The other would be a 100-ton 20-passenger plane that would fly to 130 km at Mach 8. They would be equipped with liquid methane/liquid oxygen rocket engines. The larger spaceplane would also be able to carry a strap-on space rocket, making it function as the first stage of a two-stage to orbit space launch platform. That rocket would launch above the Karman line, and lift 1–2 tons to LEO.

U.S. sanctions 

In August 2020, the United States Department of Defense released the names of “Communist Chinese military companies” operating directly or indirectly in the United States. CALT was included on the list. 

In November 2020, U.S. President Donald Trump issued an executive order prohibiting U.S. companies and individuals owning shares in companies, including CALT, that the U.S. Department of Defense has listed as having links to the People's Liberation Army.

Subsidiaries
 China Energine
 China Rocket, which developed Jielong 1

References

External links

Space program of the People's Republic of China
Rocket engine manufacturers of China
Technology companies established in 1957
Research institutes in China
1957 establishments in China

Government-owned companies of China
Defence companies of China